Microvoluta joloensis is a species of sea snail, a marine gastropod mollusk in the family Volutomitridae.

Description

Distribution
This marine species occurs off Papua New Guinea.

References

  Bouchet P. & Kantor Y. 2004. New Caledonia: the major centre of biodiversity for volutomitrid molluscs (Mollusca: Neogastropoda: Volutomitridae). Systematics and Biodiversity 1(4): 467–502.
 Y. Kantor, 2010, Checklist of Recent Volutomitridae

External links
 Cernohorsky W.O. (1970). New Mitridae and Volutomitridae. The Nautilus. 83(3): 95-104

Volutomitridae
Gastropods described in 1970